Bissetia  may refer to:
 Bissetia (plant), a moss genus in the family Neckeraceae
 Bissetia (moth), a moth genus in the family Crambidae